William Wilson (April 27, 1794 – April 29, 1857) was an American jurist.

Born in Loudoun County, Virginia, Wilson studied law in Virginia. In 1812, he served in the United States Army under General Andrew Jackson in New Orleans, Louisiana during the War of 1812. In 1817, Wilson moved to Kentucky and then settled in Carmi, Illinois. Wilson was admitted to the Illinois Bar. In 1819, Wilson was elected to the Illinois Supreme Court and served until 1848 when the Illinois Constitution of 1848 went into effect. He served as chief justice of the supreme court. Wilson was a Whig and later a Democrat. In 1848, Wilson resumed his law practice. He died in Carmi, Illinois.

Notes

1794 births
1857 deaths
People from Loudoun County, Virginia
People from Carmi, Illinois
United States Army personnel of the War of 1812
Illinois lawyers
Illinois Democrats
Illinois Whigs
19th-century American politicians
Chief Justices of the Illinois Supreme Court
19th-century American judges
19th-century American lawyers
Justices of the Illinois Supreme Court